Šta bi dao da si na mom mjestu (trans. What Would You Give to Be in My Place) is the second studio album from influential Yugoslav rock band Bijelo Dugme, released in 1975.

The album was polled the 17th on the 100 greatest Yugoslav rock and pop albums list in the 1998 book YU 100: najbolji albumi jugoslovenske rok i pop muzike (YU 100: The Best Albums of Yugoslav Pop and Rock Music).

Background and recording

After the huge commercial and critical success of Bijelo Dugme's debut album, Kad bi' bio bijelo dugme, and a successful tour that followed it, the band went to the Borike village in Eastern Bosnia in the fall of 1975 to work on songs for the following album.

The album recording sessions started in November 1975, in London. The album was produced by Neil Harrison, who had previously worked with Cockney Rebel and Gonzalez. The bass guitar on the album was played by the band's vocalist, Željko Bebek, as the bass guitarist Zoran Redžić injured his middle finger just before the album recording started. Nevertheless, Redžić is credited on the album, as he worked on the bass lines, and directed Bebek during the recording. At the time, in the same studios, Roxy Music worked on their album Siren. The members of the band on several occasions visited Bijelo Dugme's recording sessions, expressing likes for Bijelo Dugme's songs.

During the album recording, the band recorded an English language song, "Playing the Part", which was not released on the album, but appeared on the promo single distributed to journalists. "Playing the Part" lyrics were written by Dave Townsend; Jugoton executive Veljko Despot, who stayed with the band in London during the album recording, looking for someone to write the English language lyrics, contacted an artists agency, which sent Townsend.

Album cover
The album cover was designed by Dragan S. Stefanović, who had also designed the cover of the band's previous album. The photograph featured Zoran Redžić's girlfriend at the time.

Track listing
All the songs were written by Goran Bregović, except where noted.

Personnel
Goran Bregović - guitar, harmonica
Željko Bebek - vocals, bass guitar
Zoran Redžić - bass guitar
Ipe Ivandić - drums
Vlado Pravdić - organ, synthesizer, electric piano, piano

Additional personnel
Neil Harrison - producer
Peter Henderson - engineer
Chris Blair - mastered by
Dragan S. Stefanović - design, photography

Reception
The album was a huge commercial success in Yugoslavia, the songs "Tako ti je, mala moja, kad ljubi Bosanac", "Došao sam da ti kažem da odlazim", "Ne gledaj me tako i ne ljubi me više" and "Požurite, konji moji" becoming nationwide hits and the album selling more than 200,000 copies. After the first 50,000 records sold, Šta bi dao da si na mom mjestu became the first Yugoslav album to be credited as a diamond record. After selling more than 100,000 copies, it became the first platinum record in the history of Yugoslav discography, and after reaching the 200,000 copies mark it was branded simply as "2× diamond record".

New Year's performance for Tito
Right after the album's release, its initial promotion was scheduled to take place at a New Year's 1976 concert at Belgrade Sprts Hall along with Pop Mašina, Buldožer and Cod as opening acts. However, five days before New Year's, the band canceled the concert due to getting invited to perform for Yugoslav president Josip Broz Tito at the Croatian National Theatre (HNK) in Zagreb as part of the New Year's celebration.

The performance for the eighty-three-year-old president did not go according to what the band had expected, as recounted by Bregović in various media appearances after the dissolution of Yugoslavia: 

In the years since, Bebek also looked back on the band's performance for Tito. In 1976, months after the performance, he wrote for Džuboks mgazine about the personal feelings the event stirred in him. In the published piece, the singer expresses exhilaration at getting the opportunity to perform for "the most respected and dearest guest" while drawing parallels to the excitement of his only prior in-person sighting of Tito during his adolescence at the Relay of Youth running in Sarajevo. However, during a 2018 television interview, he recalled Bijelo Dugme's performance for Tito much differently: 

There have been reports in Yugoslav press that Bijelo Dugme's performance for Tito may have had something, at least in part, with the band manager Mihaljek's sudden firing that occurred weeks prior. Mihaljek reportedly got contacted in December 1975 by Tito's representatives from the Yugoslav presidential protocol who weren't aware about him no longer representing the band. Knowing that Bijelo Dugme had already been booked for a lucrative New Year's show in Belgrade and being aware that a verbal commitment to the Yugoslav Presidency would have to be honoured one way or another (even if it meant canceling the already arranged Belgrade appearance to the band's financial detriment), Mihaljek reportedly decided to get back at his former clients by accepting the presidential invitation despite not being authorized to do so. Discussing Mihaljek's reportedly underhanded role in the band's performance for Tito, journalist Dušan Vesić said: "Even if Mihaljek managed to exact some revenge by making them lose all that money, he unwittingly ended up doing them a long term favour because being seen performing for Tito sent a powerful implicit signal to all the executive aparatchiks on Yugoslav television that the band is now untouchable when it comes to TV appearances in Yugoslavia".

Tour
The tour following the album release was very successful. It featured three sold-out concerts in Belgrade's Pionir Hall in early February 1976. The tour confirmed and furthered Bijelo Dugme's standing as the most popular band in Yugoslavia, a status they had previously achieved with the success of their debut album. Yugoslav print journalists coined the term "Dugmemanija" (Buttonmania) that began to be used frequently as the public in the socialist country observed a new cultural phenomenon.

In popular culture
The album's record-breaking sales as well as the enormous popularity of the "Tako ti je, mala moja, kad ljubi Bosanac" track among all strata of Yugoslav society, in addition to its heavy rotation on Yugoslav radio, prompted film director Soja Jovanović to include the hit song in her Television Belgrade-produced 1976 comedy TV film Izvinjavamo se, mnogo se izvinjavamo (Sorry, Terribly Sorry), centered around Milić Barjaktarević (played by Slobodan Đurić), a prizewinning farmer on his way to an agriculture fair in Belgrade while on constant lookout for a woman to marry and take back to his village. The song becomes somewhat of a plot point in the train scene when Milić turns on his pocket radio, hears "Tako ti je, mala moja, kad ljubi Bosanac", and instantly starts rocking out to it in a clumsy attempt of wooing his somewhat more refined fellow passenger Borka (Milena Dravić).

Legacy
The album was polled in 1998 as the 17th on the list of 100 greatest Yugoslav rock and pop albums in the book YU 100: najbolji albumi jugoslovenske rok i pop muzike (YU 100: The Best Albums of Yugoslav Pop and Rock Music).

The title track was polled in 2000 as the 68th on the Rock Express Top 100 Yugoslav Rock Songs of All Times list.

In 2014, author and director Dušan Vesić wrote a biography of Bijelo Dugme, entitled Bijelo Dugme: Šta bi dao da si na mom mjestu. In the book, Vesić wrote:

{{cquote|It [the album] had a fantastic title, and it is the life maxim of Bijelo Dugme. If I had to explain Bijelo Dugme in one sentence, that would be it: 'Wouldn't you like to be in my place?'}}

In 2015, Šta bi dao da si na mom mjestu album cover was ranked 10th on the list of 100 Greatest Album Covers of Yugoslav Rock published by web magazine Balkanrock.

Claims of plagiarism
In 2010s, articles appeared in Balkan media claiming that the album's title track plagiarizes the song "I Am the Dance of Ages" by the British rock band Argent, released on their 1972 album All Together Now."PRIČA O PJESMI: Šta bi dao da si na mom mjestu", Express.ba

Covers
Yugoslav pop trio Aska recorded a Bijelo Dugme songs medley on their 1982 album Disco Rock, featuring, among other Bijelo Dugme songs, "Požurite, konji moji".
Serbian and Yugoslav pop singer Neda Ukraden recorded a cover of "Hop-cup" on her 1995 album Između ljubavi i mržnje (Between Love and Hate).
Bosnian turbo folk singer Selma Bajrami recorded a cover of "Požurite, konji moji", with altered lyrics and entitled "Sviće dan" ("Dawn Is Coming"), on her 1999 album Ljubav si ubio, gade (You Killed Love, You Bastard).
Serbian and Yugoslav rock singer Viktorija recorded a cover of "Došao sam da ti kažem da odlazim" on her 2000 album Nostalgija (Nostalgia).
Macedonian composer Vasko Serafimov recorded a cover of "Došao sam da ti kažem da odlazim" on his 2006 album Here''.

References

Šta bi dao da si na mom mjestu at Discogs

External links
Šta bi dao da si na mom mjestu at Discogs

Bijelo Dugme albums
1975 albums
Jugoton albums